Space Pirate Captain Herlock: The Endless Odyssey, also known in Japan as Space Pirate Captain Harlock: Outside Legend - The Endless Odyssey, is an OVA of Space Pirate Captain Harlock.

English Cast
Lex Lang as Captain Herlock
Anthony Mozdy as Dr. Zero
Richard Cansino as Tadashi Daiba
David Lelyveld as Yattaran
James Lyon as Chief Ilita
Julie Ann Taylor as Kei Yuki
Kari Wahlgren as Nana
Mia Bradly as Mimeh
Michelle Ruff as Shizuka Namino

Japanese Cast

Kōichi Yamadera as Captain Herlock
Chafurin as Chief Engineer Maji
Emi Shinohara as Shizuka Namino
Fumiko Orikasa as Nana
Nachi Nozawa as Dr. Zero
Naoki Tatsuta as Yattran
Norio Wakamoto as Chief Ilita
Rei Sakuma as Kei Yuki
Reiko Suzuki as Masu
Tomokazu Seki as Tadashi Daiba
Yuko Minaguchi as Mimeh

Reception

The series got mostly positive reviews from critics.

References

External links
  
 
 

2002 anime OVAs
Adventure anime and manga
Captain Harlock
Madhouse (company)
Science fiction anime and manga